Refresh Your Senses is the seventh studio album by the Serbian alternative rock band Disciplina Kičme, and the third to be released by the London version of the band working under an alternative band name Disciplin A Kitschme. The album was released by the Tom Tom Music for former Yugoslavia and Babaroga records for the United Kingdom. Part of the material on the album featured rerecorded versions of Disciplina Kičme songs, featuring lyrics in English language. The album featured songs dealing with the new political situation in Serbia, "D' Demoncracy Yeah" and "Surely They Won't Get Much... of My Sympathy".

Track listing 
All tracks written by Black Tooth, and arranged by Disciplin A Kitschme.

Personnel

The band 
 Black Tooth (Dušan Kojić) — bass, vocals [shouting], producer, mixed by, written by
 Gofie Bebe — vocals, percussion, whistle [da real whistle] 
 Will Parker — drums

Additional personnel 
 DJ Illusion Excluder — mixed by
 Pete Lorentz — mixed by
 John Kleine — mastered by
 Patric Bird — mastered by

References 
 EX YU ROCK enciklopedija 1960-2006, Janjatović Petar; 
 Refresh Your Senses, NOW! at Discogs

2001 albums
Disciplina Kičme albums